Leptophobia is a Neotropical genus of butterflies in the family Pieridae.

Species
Leptophobia aripa (Boisduval, 1836)
Leptophobia caesia (Lucas, 1852)
Leptophobia cinerea (Hewitson, 1867)
Leptophobia diaguita Jörgensen, 1916
Leptophobia eleone (Doubleday, 1847)
Leptophobia eleusis (Lucas, 1852)
Leptophobia erinna (Hopffer, 1874)
Leptophobia eucosma (Erschoff, 1875)
Leptophobia forsteri Baumann & Reissinger, 1969
Leptophobia gonzaga Fruhstorfer, 1908
Leptophobia helena (Lucas, 1852)
Leptophobia micaia Lamas, Pyrcz & Rodríguez, 2004
Leptophobia nephthis (Hopffer, 1874)
Leptophobia olympia (Felder, C & R Felder, 1861)
Leptophobia penthica (Kollar, 1850)
Leptophobia philoma (Hewitson, 1870)
Leptophobia pinara (Felder, C & R Felder, 1865)
Leptophobia tovaria (Felder, C & R Felder, 1861)

References

Pierini
Pieridae of South America
Pieridae genera
Taxa named by Arthur Gardiner Butler